The Dismemberment Plan was a Washington, D.C. based indie rock band formed on January 1, 1993. Also known as D-Plan or The Plan, the name was derived from an industry phrase used by insurance salesman Ned Ryerson in the popular comedy Groundhog Day. The band members included Eric Axelson (bass), Jason Caddell (guitar), Joe Easley (drums), and Travis Morrison (vocals and guitar). Axelson, Caddell, Morrison and original drummer Steve Cummings formed the band in college, knowing each other from attending northern Virginia high schools (Axelson, Cummings, and Morrison attended Lake Braddock Secondary School in Burke, Virginia). Cummings left the band after the recording of their debut album ! and was replaced by Easley, cementing the band's lineup.

The Dismemberment Plan released four albums before breaking up in 2003, the best known being 1999's critically acclaimed Emergency & I. They reunited in early 2011, touring the US and Japan and releasing a live album. A comeback album, Uncanney Valley, was released on October 15, 2013.

Band history

1993–2003: Original years
Aside from a brief interlude in 1998 and 1999 when they were signed by Interscope Records, the band recorded for the Washington, D.C independent label DeSoto Records. Their breakthrough album, Emergency & I, was actually created during their time at Interscope. However, they were dropped from the label shortly after its completion, and thus took it back with them to DeSoto, where it wound up being released. The EP The Ice of Boston is the only item of theirs Interscope actually released during their tenure there. The band managed to avoid being in debt to the label, effectively being able to record on a major label budget with no consequence. The band referred to their situation in a later interview as "slipping through the cracks".Following the massive underground success of Emergency & I, the band received an even higher profile after being invited to open for the European leg of Pearl Jam's 2000 tour. A co-headlining tour in 2002 with Death Cab for Cutie (called the "Death and Dismemberment Tour") also worked well to raise both bands' profiles and cross-pollinate their fanbases, as well as forge creative ties between several members. Later that summer and fall the Dismemberment Plan started to debut songs for their follow-up to 2001's Change. In 2002 the band put all the music tracks from their last two albums on their website, encouraging fans to remix the songs. The result was 2003's A People's History of the Dismemberment Plan. On January 19, 2003, however, the band announced on their website that they had decided to break up after a few tours that year. A final show was planned for July 28, 2003 in Washington D.C.'s famous outdoor show space, Fort Reno Park. However come show-time a heavy rain threatened to damage their electronic equipment and drove off all but the most devoted fans, leading the band to add one more final show. On September 1, 2003, they closed out their career with a sold-out show at the renowned 9:30 Club, dubbed the "one last slice" show. By the band's breakup, Emergency & I and Change had sold 22,000 copies each in the US.

2003–2010: Post-breakup activity
Morrison took the post-Change songs with him for further work, and released many of them on his first album, Travistan, released in 2004. Eric Axelson started a band called Maritime with former members of The Promise Ring. They released three albums: Glass Floor in 2004, We, the Vehicles in 2006, and Heresy and the Hotel Choir in 2007.

On March 1, 2007, the band announced they would be playing a one-and-off reunion show on Saturday, April 28, 2007 at Washington D.C.'s venerable Black Cat nightclub. The event was a charity concert benefiting Callum Robbins, son of J. Robbins, frontman for DeSoto Records labelmate Jawbox. Fan reaction to the decision was overwhelmingly positive, and tickets to the concert sold out within minutes of being offered online. In response to the high demand for tickets, a second show was announced for April 27. Travis Morrison has stated that the band probably won't be getting back together, "except to drink beer".

2010–2015: Reunion, Uncanney Valley and inactivity
On September 13, 2010, The Washington Post Click Track reported that the band would reunite for a tour, in support of Barsuk Records' reissue of 1999's Emergency & I. "We're not planning a new record," bassist Eric Axelson told Click Track. "But we're doing these shows and taking it day to day after that." The 2011 tour kicked off with a performance on Late Night with Jimmy Fallon, followed by three Washington, D.C. shows (two at the 9:30 Club, one at the Black Cat) January 21–23. The band would play 10 more shows in 2011, including high-profile appearances at the Pitchfork Music Festival in Chicago and the annual "Roots Picnic" in Philadelphia.

In August 2012, wanting to play "a couple of small, sweaty summer shows like we used to do", the Dismemberment Plan played small-venue shows in Baltimore and Fredericksburg, Va where they debuted eight new songs. As of August 13, 2012, according to Travis Morrison, "We have a bunch more [new songs] coming so we're going back to the lab to work on brand new ones and tweak these. No plans for recording as of yet, although certainly those conversations are happening now." Shortly thereafter, the band announced that they would be playing the Virgin FreeFest in October, along with two more accompanying shows.

On July 16, 2013, the band shared "Waiting", the lead single from their forthcoming fifth album Uncanney Valley, which could initially be heard by calling the promotional phone number 252-64-DPLAN. Two more singles, "Invisible" and "Daddy Was a Real Good Dancer", were released on August 19 and September 11 respectively.

On October 15, 2013, the band released Uncanney Valley on Partisan Records.

In November 2013, the band played the final holiday camp edition of the All Tomorrow's Parties festival in Camber Sands, England.

The band last updated their website in October 2014, and as of May 2022 is inactive, though no announcement by the band has been made on its status. The band's final show to date was a New Year's Eve concert in 2014 at the Brighton Music Hall in Boston, Massachusetts.

Musical style
While drawing heavily from previous Washington-based art-punk acts such as Fugazi and Jawbox, the Dismemberment Plan are significant for incorporating R&B (in stage banter, Morrison often talked of his obsession with Gladys Knight) and hip-hop influences to their sound.  Influential indie rock criticism website Pitchfork Media has called them the fathers of the late-1990s/early-2000s dance-punk movement, which in turn fostered the current new wave revival.  Ironic humor was also a major component of the band's aesthetic, as displayed in songs such as "The Dismemberment Plan Gets Rich" (Dismemberment Plan/Juno) and "The Ice of Boston" (...Is Terrified).

Discography
Studio albums
"!" (1995)
The Dismemberment Plan Is Terrified (1997)
Emergency & I (1999)
Change (2001)
Uncanney Valley (2013)

Live album
Live In Japan 2011 (2011)

EPs
Can We Be Mature? (1994)
The Ice of Boston (1998)
Juno & The Dismemberment Plan (Split EP) (2000)

Compilations and appearances
Give Me the Cure (1996)
Ooh Do I Love You (1996)
Fort Reno Benefit (1997)
A People's History of The Dismemberment Plan (2003)

Singles
"What Do You Want Me to Say?" / "Since You Died" (1997)
"Waiting" (2013)
"Invisible" (2013)
"Daddy Was a Real Good Dancer" (2013)

References

External links

The Dismemberment Plan on Partisan Records

Post-punk revival music groups
American post-hardcore musical groups
Indie rock musical groups from Washington, D.C.
Musical groups established in 1993
Musical groups disestablished in 2003
Musical groups reestablished in 2007
Musical groups reestablished in 2010
Musical quartets
1993 establishments in Washington, D.C.
MapleMusic Recordings artists
Partisan Records artists
Interscope Records artists